General elections were held in Peru on 10 April 2011 to elect the President, the Vice Presidents, 130 members of Congress and five members of the Andean Parliament. As no presidential candidate received a majority in the first round, a second round was held on 5 June to determine the successor of outgoing president Alan García. Former army officer Ollanta Humala narrowly defeated Keiko Fujimori, daughter of imprisoned former President Alberto Fujimori. Humala was sworn in as the 94th President of Peru on 28 July.

Background

After the third presidential term of Alberto Fujimori, new rules were established to curtail presidential authority. The outgoing president is now forbidden to run for reelection until five years have elapsed since the end of a presidential term.

Peruvian politics adhere to a multi-party system, in which no one political group has a majority in Congress. This has led recent administrations to form loose alliances while in office to govern effectively. Such multi-party system has been in place ever since the administration of President Alberto Fujimori (1990–2000), following his 1992 dissolution of Congress.

The elections are organised by three groups. First of all the RENIEC (National Registry of Identification and Civil Status), they are in charge of maintaining the civil records. And by that they define who has to vote and who doesn't. In Peru, all citizens aged 18 to 70 are compelled to vote, elections being discretionary past the age of 70. The real organization of the elections and also of all other referendums is done by the ONPE (National Office of Electoral Processes). The last organisation is the JNE (National Jury of Elections), they are looking into the legality of the elections and the campaign plans.

Presidential candidates

The election campaigns started early in the summer of 2010. During most of 2010, polls were led by two right wing political parties: Solidaridad Nacional (National Solidarity), led by former mayor of Lima Luis Castañeda Lossio and Fuerza 2011 (Force 2011), led by ex-president Alberto Fujimori's daughter, Keiko Fujimori. In November 2010, Alianza por el Gran Cambio (Alliance for the Great Change) launched the candidacy of the former prime minister Pedro Pablo Kuczynski. Claiming a more centrist stand are, APRA the ruling party and Peru Posible (Possible Peru), under the leadership of former Peruvian President Alejandro Toledo.

The left-wing politician Ollanta Humala is supported by the Peruvian Nationalist Party.

The Fuerza Social and Cambio Radical do not have presidential candidates. The incumbent Alan García's American Popular Revolutionary Alliance is also not fielding a candidate in the election.

Alejandro Toledo is a former president.

Keiko Fujimori campaign ran on support of the status quo free-market policies, however she was seen as hindered because of her ties to her father Alberto Fujimori, who is in prison for corruption and human rights crimes following a crackdown on the Túpac Amaru Revolutionary Movement in the 1990s, following the Japanese embassy hostage crisis in 1996–1997. In addition, her campaign has been
criticized for vote-buying.

Pedro Pablo Kuczynski, a former prime minister, is also known as "El Gringo" because he has U.S. citizenship and is of European descent. His support was seen as limited outside Lima because of his support amongst the country's elite.

Ollanta Humala, who had once led a military revolt in 2000 that was quickly put down, softened what was seen as his anti-capitalist tone to look more moderate along the lines of Brazil's former president Luiz Inacio Lula da Silva. He told a campaign rally that "We are willing to make many concessions to unite Peru, we are going to talk with all political forces. Social problems must be resolved through dialogue. Let's vote without fear." Voters were seen to vote against Garcia in order to have a "fairer division of Peru's booming economy – backed by rich mineral resources – a key issue for more than a third of the population still living in poverty." The other candidates tried to discredit him by saying he would increase state control over the economy, roll back reforms and jeopardise about $40bn in potential foreign investment over the next decade in mining and energy exploration. Moody's ratings agency also said that Peru's investment-grade credit rating would not be threatened should Humala win. Despite this the sol and the Lima Stock Exchange's flagship index main stock index fell over the two weeks before the first round of the election on speculation that Humala would raise mining taxes, increase state subsidies and/or tighten control of such "strategic" sectors as electricity.

Opinion polls conducted in late May 2011 showed Fujimori and Humala in a statistical tie in a runoff vote scheduled for 5 June 2011, with one point separating the two candidates.

Support for the second round 

Some of the candidates and parties eliminated in second round have expressed their support for one of the contestants in the run-off election.

Alliance for the Great Change candidate P. P. Kuczynski declared that he would vote for Fujimori, as well as his running mate Máximo San Román and ally Humberto Lay (National Restoration), whereas Humanists' leader Yehude Simon declared his support for Humala.

The Possible Peru Alliance and its candidate Alejandro Toledo also announced support for the "Peru Wins"-candidate in exchange for a participation in Humala's aspired government.

National Solidarity leader Luis Castañeda on the other hand uttered his backing for the Force 2011 frontwoman.

APRA does not have a clear party line yet but former Prime minister Javier Velásquez inclined to Keiko Fujimori's side.

Nobel laureate writer Mario Vargas Llosa, liberal presidential candidate of 1990 and opponent of Alberto Fujimori, stated that he would "never vote" for Fujimori's daughter and warned the nation of a "return to dictatorship" that came up with a victory of Keiko. He, personally, would vote for Humala, "unhappily and with fear" but as the lesser evil.

Debates

First round

Second round

Opinion polls

Results

President

Congress

Andean Parliament

Reactions
Fujimori congratulated Humala on his victory after admitting defeat.

States
 – After the first-round, President Evo Morales sent a letter to Humala congratulating him and said of those who voted for him did so "to advance with the transformation of their nation and its institutions...Receive in my name, from the government and from the Bolivian people, a fraternal and revolutionary salute."
 – President Juan Manuel Santos called Humala the next day to congratulate him for his "victory in the electoral vote that consolidates the Peruvian democracy. Santos reiterated Colombia's commitment to continue working at the strengthening of relations between the two countries and of all Latin America." This was despite concerns in Colombia of being "surrounded by leftists."
Finance Minister Juan Carlos Echeverry said that a merger between the two countries' stock exchanges was unlikely to be affected. He also said that Humala could "prove the markets wrong" in reference to concerns over former Brazilian President Luiz Inacio Lula da Silva's electoral victory. However, the Bogotá Stock Exchange indices also fell.

Economic
The Lima Stock Exchange index also plunged the following day amid concerns of Humala's economic policies and cabinet ministers.

Government formation
Former president Alejandro Toledo was set to be in talk with Humala to join his government in some form. However, in mid-July he quit the talks, though he said legislators from their two parties would vote together on some issues.

About a week before his inauguration Humala introduced a cabinet line-up that was positively received by financial markets and the business community because most appointees were read as "moderate" and "establishment" figures who thus allayed apparent fears of radical change. His cabinet line-up includes:

On 18 August, the cabinet authorised the creation of the Ministry of Development and Social Inclusion whose function would be to implement the social programmes of the government to promote "social inclusion." The ministry was created to turn the social programmes into productive tools for the benefit of the poor and that one of its objectives would be to create the conditions so that beneficiaries of the Juntos programme use subsidies for "financial leverage" so as to improve their quality of life.

As a result of Humala's appointees, which came in contrast to concerns he would introduce changes that could hurt Peru's economic growth, Peru's sol-denominated bonds increased as yields fell from 7.84 percent for maturities in due in August 2020 to 6.12 percent. The bond prices gained 0.29 centimo to 111.78 centimos per sol, the highest since 23 February. Carlos Herrera said that Peru would seek a mining windfall profits tax after consultations with companies.

Reaction
In reaction to the perceived "moderate" appointments the sol held steady at a three-year high. The credit rating agency Fitch also reaffirmed Peru's BBB− credit rating with a positive outlook. The decision to keep Velarde at the Central Bank also resulted in a rise for the Lima Stock Exchange's indices. Roque Benavides, the chief executive officer of Cia. de Minas Buenaventura SA, (Peru's largest precious metals producer) said of Humala's ministerial appointees that "there are very, very good ministers who have been called to contribute. What we have now is better than what we expected." Mining companies such as Southern Copper and Cia. de Minas Buenaventura SA had previously warned against a tax on sales, which could make the mining industry less competitive and affect the US$42 billion in planned mining investment. Southern Copper said that it expected a "positive result" from consultation talks on the proposed new windfall tax levy on mining companies. Financial Planning Manager Raul Jacob said that the government would continue to support new mining projects like the US$1 billion Tia Maria copper mine.

However, his softening stance on regulating and taxing the mining sector caused consternation amongst some of his original supporters. Mario Huaman, the head of the General Workers’ Confederation (the largest labour union in Peru, who also endorsed Humala) said that: "We’re worried. We’ll listen very carefully to what he says in the coming days and see if he shares our views. Then we’ll decide our plan of action, our plan to fight. He promised change." Renee Ramirez, the general secretary of the Education Workers Union said that: "The new government has built up such great hopes that if it doesn’t follow through there’ll be a big divorce. We’re not going to keep quiet. We threw our weight behind Humala but we didn’t write him a blank check."

Alvaro Vargas Llosa, a senior fellow at the Washington, D.C.-based Independent Institute and son of Mario Vargas Llosa said that "He has to find a way to keep the base close while not letting it dictate economic policy." Erasto Almeida, a political analyst at Eurasia Group added that if his opinion rating drops further or the economy slows that Humala "could be tempted later on in his mandate" to adopt less market-friendly policies.

Indigenous groups, such as AIDESEP in the Amazon, have expressed disappointment with Humala's move away from the left amidst his campaign promises to champion the Inca empire. They cited such reasons as Humala plan to go through with a Garcia-era proposal to bring in up to US$20 billion in the next five years, US$6.2 billion of which Garcia had already lined-up, for such measures as oil exploration in the Amazon. Alberto Pizango, the head AIDESEP, said that "The [indigenous] communities had entrusted this government to oversee a real, profound change. But Humala has altered his discourse, leading the people to say this government will just be more of the same." He also criticised the appointment of Herrera because of the latters approval of petroleum concessions when he first held the ministerial post in 2000.

Former President Alan García chaired his final cabinet meeting on 27 July. At it he said:
I wanted to thank all of the ministers, also the regional presidents have put in a great deal of effort into their jobs, and mayors who are those who develop directly and closely with the people. [I am convinced that] when you put zeal aside, history will recognise what these ministers achieved with their effort. Much will have to be done for our country, but I think that the path chosen was the correct one, and the perseverance and the dedication was necessary. A salute to Peru, to the youth of Peru, to the poor of Peru, to the authorities of Peru, and as a follower of Haya de La Torre all I wanted to do was make a government that gives bread with freedom. A salute to Peru, to its future and success."

Inauguration
Prior to his inauguration on 28 July, Humala's popularity fell in opinion polls after he suspended his brother Alexis Humala from Gana Peru following allegations of corruption in relation to deals with Gazprom. His approval rating of 70% fell to 41%.

For inauguration day itself Lima's main downtown square was scheduled to be open without security restrictions. Javier Sanguinetti, police chief for the Lima region, said that his office was working with the tourism police department and that 10,000 police officers would be deployed at popular tourist attractions around Lima on 28 and 29 July.

Former President Alan García was not scheduled to attend the event because, according to him, the inauguration "is to hear the new president's message" and that although he attended Alberto Fujimori's inauguration in 1990 "there was such unrest in congress, because of my presence, that I’d rather focus on my health, and say ‘Let the new president give his message freely, let's not vent our frustrations in front of foreign heads of state.'" His critics read this as a snub to Humala. However, foreign dignitaries such as Colombia's Juan Manuel Santos was scheduled to attend the event, along with Brazil's Dilma Rousseff, Uruguay's José Mujica, Panama's Ricardo Martinelli (and his wife First Lady Marta Linares de Martinelli), Argentina's Cristina Fernández de Kirchner, Chile's Sebastián Piñera, Ecuador's Rafael Correa, Bolivia's Evo Morales, Guatemala's Álvaro Colom, Honduras’ Porfirio Lobo, South Africa's Jacob Zuma and Georgia's Mikheil Saakashvili. They would also be joined by Cuban First Vice President Jose Ramon Machado Ventura and his delegation, Spain's crown prince Felipe, Prince of Asturias, Secretary-general of the Organization of American States Jose Miguel Insulza, the U.S. ambassador, the brother of South Korean President Lee Myung-bak, Lee Sang-deuk of the incumbent Grand National Party and Chinese President Hu Jintao's special envoy Minister of Agriculture Han Changfu.

Piñera, who was welcomed by outgoing Economics Minister Ismael Benavides after his arrival at 23:00 said: "From the core of my soul, I want to wish President Humala the best of luck, as well as to the Peruvian government and the Peruvian people." Santos, who was welcomed by outgoing Prime Minister Rosario Fernández, said that "We consider Peru a true strategic partner on many fronts. Every relationship can be strengthened, improved. The relationship with Peru has been extraordinary, but we’re going to see how we can continue feeding it, strengthening it, improving it." Machado Ventura, who was welcomed by the outgoing Minister of the Interior Miguel Hidalgo, relayed greetings and said that Humala electoral victory was an "example of the continuing advance of progressive forces in Latin America;" he added that the proposed a "nationalist programme" would "promote greater equity in the distribution of the country's wealth and that Cuba wishes him success in this effort." His delegation also included Foreign Minister Bruno Rodríguez Parrilla, Deputy Foreign Minister Rogelio Sierra, the new Cuban ambassador to Peru Juana Martínez González and the outgoing Cuban ambassador Luis Delfín Pérez. The delegation was also invited Peru's commemoration of their 190 anniversary of independence. The outgoing President Alan García hosted a reception for the visiting heads of state and foreign dignitaries the night before the inauguration. Morales and Piñera also scheduled a bilateral meeting on the sidelines of the event.

Garcia left the presidential palace after he passed on the presidential sash to Humala. Before wearing the sash, Humala also made a speech in which he promised "to fight for social integration, particularly of the poorest." He also said that he would not alter the existing market-oriented policies and would keep trade policies intact; he added that he provide a minimum pension for all Peruvians over the age of 65 and raise the minimum wage. "We want the term 'social exclusion' to disappear from our language and lives forever. Economic growth and social inclusion will march together." In tackling social conflict and drug trafficking he said that the United States is a "strategic partner." He also quoted South Africa's Nelson Mandela when he argued that there cannot be a democracy where misery and "social asymmetry" persist." However, he broke with tradition when he did not travel to Congress to attend the inauguration. During the swearing-in ceremony he was shouted down by the "Fujimoristas" (supporters of Keiko Fujimori and her father Alberto) after he said that was taking power" in the spirit of the 1979 constitution: "The constitution of 1979, the last constitution of democratic origin, which many have not respected and that's why it has been forgotten, is for me a true inspiration for its national and democratic content."

Initial initiatives
On 25 August, the Congress gave its vote of confidence in approving the Council of Ministers after Prime Minister Salomon Lerner Ghitis spoke to the Congress by a vote of 90 in favour, zero against and 33 abstentations, all of whom were from Fuerza 2011. Tejada expressed his satisfaction and gratitude at the recognition of the "technical support" for the government's programmes and goals. "We call on Peruvians to be confident that President Ollanta Humala is setting the beginning of a new phase of growth with social inclusion in the history of Peru, respecting human rights and freedom of speech." The initiatives were backed by the National Confederation of Private Business Associations (CONFIEP) as confirmed by President Humberto Speziani who said that "Overall we agree with all ten policies announced by the Cabinet, which is headed by Salomon Lerner. [Ghitis' goals are] "necessary to grow with social inclusion."

One of Humala's first tasks amongst his promises for social inclusion was to start the implementation of a two-stage 25% increase in the monthly minimum wage to 750 sol and unveiling a pension increase for those older than 65.

Humala also sought to create a national flag carrier airline in cooperation with private investment, especially to such unprofitable domestic markets as the hinterlands of the Andes and the Amazon.

During the first month of Humala's presidency, an agreement was reached with mining companies that would increase taxes by up to three billion sols a year however, Carlos Herrera said a new royalty rate had not been set as yet. Prime Minister Salomon Lerner Ghitis said that "this tax will not affect investment or companies' competitiveness."

Amongst his initial social policies, modeled after Brazil during the tenure of Lula da Silva, were: a non-contributory basic pension of about US$90 per month for the elderly who lack other provisions, a state-run child-care programme, an increase in scholarships for poor students who want a university education and the expansion of a conditional cash transfer scheme for the poor. However, he said that such programmes would be introduced gradually, hence, according to government officials, the cost for the following year would be a more moderate figure of US$275m.

References

External links

Candidates
 Keiko Fujimori 
 Ollanta Humala
 Alejandro Toledo
 Pedro Pablo Kuczynski
 Luis Castañeda Lossio
 Rafael Belaúnde
 José Ñique de la Puente
 Juliana Reymer

Post-election
 What next for Humala?

Elections in Peru
Peru
2011 in Peru
Presidential elections in Peru
April 2011 events in South America
June 2011 events in South America